Perlora is one of 12 parishes (administrative divisions) in Carreño, a municipality within the province and autonomous community of Asturias, in northern Spain.

The postal code is 33491.

Villages
Its villages include: Les Arenes, L'Arquiella, La Bermeya, La Braña, La Calabrina, El Caliyu, Campanal, El Campu la Iglesia, Coyanca, Castro, Colloto, El Corredor, Cueto, El Cutu, El Dormón, La Espasa, La Estación, La Estaquera, La Ferrián, La Formiga, Friera, El Monte, La Nozalera, La Pedrera, Perán, El Perecil, Perlora, Ponteo, El Prau, La Rodada, Rodiles, La Rotella, Salguero, Pozal, La Sierra, La Torre, La Xabina and Yebio.

References

Parishes in Carreño